Arsens Miskarovs (born 3 March 1961) is a Latvian former breaststroke swimmer who competed in the 1980 Summer Olympics for the Soviet Union.

References

1961 births
Living people
Latvian male breaststroke swimmers
Olympic swimmers of the Soviet Union
Swimmers at the 1980 Summer Olympics
Olympic silver medalists for the Soviet Union
Olympic bronze medalists for the Soviet Union
Olympic bronze medalists in swimming
World Aquatics Championships medalists in swimming
European Aquatics Championships medalists in swimming
Medalists at the 1980 Summer Olympics
Olympic silver medalists in swimming
Universiade medalists in swimming
Latvian Academy of Sport Education alumni
Universiade gold medalists for the Soviet Union
Universiade bronze medalists for the Soviet Union
Medalists at the 1981 Summer Universiade
Soviet male breaststroke swimmers